"Joanne" is a song recorded by American singer Lady Gaga from her fifth studio album of the same name. It was released as the album's third official single on December 22, 2017 in Italy, and a piano version,  titled "Joanne (Where Do You Think You're Goin'?)", followed in the rest of the world on January 26, 2018. The track was written and produced by Gaga and Mark Ronson, with additional production from BloodPop. Inspired by the singer's late aunt, Joanne Germanotta, the song became a focal point for the musical direction of the album. Gaga intended the song to have a healing effect for those dealing with loss and pain.

Musically, it is a country song with stripped-down acoustic composition. The lyrics talk about Joanne's death from the point of view of Gaga's family. The track was complimented for Gaga's vocals and the personal, stripped-down nature of the composition. Prior to being released as a single, "Joanne" had minor chart placements in France and the United Kingdom. Gaga performed "Joanne" at the 60th Grammy Awards and during her Joanne World Tour (2017–2018). It was also featured in the 2017 documentary Gaga: Five Foot Two, during a scene involving Gaga and her grandmother listening to the track.

The piano version of the song was accompanied by the release of a music video, which continued the loose storyline set in the previous videos for the album. The clip shows the singer belting the song around various natural settings and was critically praised. This version of the song won the Grammy Award for Best Pop Solo Performance at the 61st Annual Grammy Awards.

Background and development 

Lady Gaga's deceased aunt, Joanne Germanotta, had a profound effect on the singer's life and career. Gaga included one of her aunt's unpublished poems on her first album's booklet, and tattooed the date of her death on her left arm. She had initially written a song called "Paradise", inspired by her aunt, while making her fourth studio album, Cheek to Cheek, in 2014 with Tony Bennett. However, the song was not included on the album. While developing her fifth studio album in 2016, Joanne, Gaga wrote its title track with producer Mark Ronson at Shangri-La Studios, where the rest of the album was crafted. Describing the song as "the true heart and soul of the record", Gaga emphasized how much Joanne had influenced her family and herself.

Joanne died due to complications arising from the autoimmune disease lupus when she was 19 years old. In an interview, Gaga revealed that Joanne's lupus got more complicated after she experienced a sexual assault, and those complications resulted in her death. The incident affected the Germanotta family and according to Gaga, the grief never left them completely. Writing "Joanne" helped Gaga deal with her father's pain of losing his sister. During the New York City show of her Dive Bar Tour (2016), Gaga added that despite the song's relevance to her family, she wanted the track to appeal to everyone who had suffered the loss of any loved ones.
"My connection to her has been strong my whole life. I always wondered what it was—the mystery of Joanne—this person that I never got to meet that was an absolute tornado of both love and tragedy... She was a powerful, beautiful force in my family's life and then it's like a beautiful light that just goes out, so I've always used the fact that she didn't get to live the rest of her life as a sense of strength and power within me that I have to go out and live the rest for her."

Recording and composition 

"Joanne" is an acoustic country ballad; Stephen Thomas Erlewine of AllMusic stated that it "winks at" Dolly Parton's "Jolene" (1973). In an interview with Zane Lowe on Beats 1, Gaga revealed that it was recorded in one take. The song is written in the time signature of common time with a moderately slow tempo of 74 beats per minute. It is composed in the key of G major, with Gaga's vocals ranging from E3 to D5. "Joanne"'s chord progressions follow a basic sequence of G–D–C–G–D–C during the verses, and C–D–Em–C–C/B–Am7–D during the chorus. The album version runs for 3 minutes and 16 seconds while the piano version is 4 minutes and 39 seconds long.

The third track on the record, "Joanne" is the first time that the overall tempo of the album slows. The composition is stripped-down, with Gaga's vocals accompanied by an acoustic guitar. The singer uses a different vocal register, making the song sound like a lullaby with added percussion sounds. Andrew Unterberger of Billboard noted that the lyrics, which pay homage to Joanne, are written in the first person, but the context is derived from Gaga's family's perspective about her aunt's death. The tempo and somberness is further enhanced in the piano version, which highlighted only Gaga's vocals with only a piano in the back. Samantha Schnurr from E! noted that there was an addition to the lyrics at the end, with Gaga uttering "Call me Joanne. xo, Joanne. xoxo, Joanne."

The song featured writing and producing credit from Gaga and Ronson, with additional production on the track by BloodPop. Dave Russell and Joshua Blair recorded it at Shangri-La Studios, Malibu, California, where they were assisted by David Covell and Johnnie Burik. Additional recording work was performed by Blair and Justin Smith at Pink Duck Studios, Burbank, California. Tom Elmhirst did the audio mixing of "Joanne" at Electric Lady Studios in New York, with assistance from Joe Visciano and Brandon Bost. The mastering was done at Sterling Sound Studios in New York, by Tom Coyne and Randy Merrill. "Joanne" featured a number of instrumentations, including bass, guitar, keyboards, and Mellotron strings by Ronson; rhythmic tracks by BloodPop; acoustic guitars by Harper Simon; and percussion by Gaga.

Critical reception 
Rob Sheffield of Rolling Stone described "Joanne" as "a touching ballad", where "any trace of disco or glam" is muted by her "ostentatiously squeaky fingers on the guitar strings". NME Emily Mackay wrote that it is "a leavetaking song of great, simple beauty, more tenderly affecting than anything Gaga's done before, showcasing the emotive power rather than the force of that great voice". Sal Cinquemani of Slant Magazine gave the track a positive review in comparison to other ballads on the album, stating that the song "boasts a sublime hook and a relatively restrained vocal performance". Idolator's Patrick Brown said, "'Joanne' is definitely the best example of the 'real and personal' aesthetic Gaga has been talking up ahead of the album's release, full of pretty guitar picking and arguably her best vocal." Marc Snetiker of Entertainment Weekly said that it was "Gaga's most disarming and original ballad in years".

Writing for The Daily Telegraph, Neil McCormich called the track "lovely" and said it was "sung with unpolished directness, emphasizing lyrical themes of living a purposeful life". Sandy Cohen of The Washington Times said that "the title song is fittingly tender, though Gaga's voice sounds affected. Backed by acoustic guitar and simple percussion, it ultimately lends the track a timeless feel." Writing for The Irish Times, Laurence Mackin called it "a gorgeous guitar ballad", saying that "it strips off the plastic pop armour and reveals a much tougher, rawer side." Conversely, Jon Caramanica wrote in The New York Times that, "The title track features what's presented as the least-performed singing—listen to how she flattens out the vowel sounds, as a sort of gesture of accessibility—but it is too unsteady to lean on." The piano version of the song won in the category of Best Pop Solo Performance at the 61st Annual Grammy Awards.

Music video 
On January 24, 2018, Gaga revealed on Twitter that she would be releasing a music video along with a piano version of the song. The release was accompanied by the singer asking for donation to the Lupus Research Alliance based in New York City. The clip, which debuted online two days later, continues the loose narrative depicted in the previous music videos for the Joanne album. It starts from where the music video of "John Wayne" had ended, with Gaga venturing into the woods carrying her guitar. The "Joanne" video alternates between black and white and colored scenes, showing the singer playing instruments, wandering outdoors, playing pool with her friends, and walking alone in the forest. The opening slide talks about who Joanne was, with the closing slide showing her birthday and the day of her passing. The video features a cameo appearance from Gaga's sister, Natali Germanotta.

Joey Nolfi from Entertainment Weekly described the visual as "gorgeous", feeling that it "seems to favor the beauty of the journey over the destination... We still don't know where [Gaga] thinks she's going." Hollee Actman Becker from Elite Daily found symbolism in the scene showing Gaga crossing a bridge with a rainbow in the sky. She believed it to portray Joanne crossing into the afterlife. "What an amazing tribute — so beautiful and raw", Becker concluded. W magazine's Evelyn Wang commended Gaga for releasing a music video of an already old song, and noted how the clip was a "far cry from the psychedelic grindhouse bacchanalia of 'John Wayne', [and] is a stripped-down, folksy walk through the woods... Since 'Joanne' is a raw, emotional ballad, and the piano version of it even more so, the camera refuses to stray from the catharsis happening on Gaga's face." Megan Reynolds from Jezebel agreed with Wang, described the video as "soft and quietly sweet" and added that "Gaga gives us the best version of herself" in the clip.

Live performances 

"Joanne"'s first public appearance was on October 21, 2016, in a 15-second Budweiser commercial showing Gaga dancing in a dive bar and singing the track. The advertisement was promoting her then-upcoming Dive Bar Tour, a brief three-date promotional tour of U.S. dive bars, where the track was performed. The next performance of the song took place on the television show News Zero in Japan. The song was part of Gaga's Joanne World Tour, where she performed it while sitting down and playing a guitar engraved with the name "Joanne". During the sequence, Gaga was wearing a fringe blazer and a wide-brimmed hat. Tom Murray of the Edmonton Journal said that the track was "the naked, emotional core of the show".

At the 60th Annual Grammy Awards, Gaga performed the song along with "Million Reasons". She was joined on stage by Ronson who played guitar, while the singer played the piano. The instrument was covered by large, illuminated angel wings. Before the performance, the singer dedicated the song to her late aunt and said: "This is for love and compassion. Even when you can’t understand." Writing for E! News, Vanessa Jackson said that "Lady Gaga always finds a way to bring the house down whenever she performs", and called the performance "powerful and heartbreaking". Maria Pasquini from People thought that the performance of "Joanne" was "stirring".

Media appearance 
"Joanne" was featured in the documentary film, Gaga: Five Foot Two, which chronicled the recording of the eponymous album and the singer's life. In one of the scenes, the singer and her father visit her grandmother at the nursing home, so that she can listen to the track about Joanne. Gaga's father is "overcome with emotion, [and] steps out of the room during the visit", and her grandmother reassures the singer that she "got it right" with the song. Spencer Kornhaber of The Atlantic named it "the most memorable scene of the documentary". Bonnie Stiernberg of Billboard said that "the film reaches an apex during [this] key scene", calling it "an intimate single-camera shot that moves from Gaga's grandmother's face to her father to Gaga, who plays the song on her cellphone". Leslie Helperin of The Hollywood Reporter described the scene as "fascinating", adding that "[Gaga's] grandmother seems resistant to all this emotional hyperbole, insisting that the loss is well in the past now."

Credits and personnel 
These credits are adapted from the liner notes of Joanne.

Management
Recorded at Shangri-La Studios (Malibu, California) and Pink Duck Studios (Burbank, California)
Mixed at Electric Lady Studios (New York City, New York)
Mastered at Sterling Sound Studios (New York City, New York)
Published by Sony/ATV Songs LLC, House of Gaga Publishing (BMI) and Imagem CV/Songs of Zelig (BMI) (Songs of Zelig administered worldwide by Imagem CV)

Album version

Lady Gaga – songwriter, lead vocals, producer, percussion
Mark Ronson – songwriter, producer, bass, guitars, keyboards, Mellotron
BloodPop – producer, keyboards, rhythm track
Harper Simon – guitars
Dave Russell – recording
Joshua Blair – recording
Justin Smith – recording
David "Squirrel" Covell – recording assistant
Johnnie Burik – recording assistant
Tom Elmhirst – audio mixing
Joe Visciano – mixing assistant
Brandon Bost – mixing assistant
Tom Coyne – mastering
Randy Merrill – mastering

Piano version
Credits adapted from iTunes Store.

Lady Gaga – songwriter, lead vocals, producer
Mark Ronson – songwriter
Paul "DJ White Shadow" Blair – producer
Nick Monson – producer
Mark Nilan Jr. – producer, piano
Benjamin Rice – audio mixing

Charts

Release history

References 

2016 songs
2017 singles
2018 singles
2010s ballads
American country music songs
Country ballads
Lady Gaga songs
Grammy Award for Best Pop Solo Performance
Song recordings produced by BloodPop
Song recordings produced by Lady Gaga
Song recordings produced by Mark Ronson
Commemoration songs
Songs written by Lady Gaga
Songs written by Mark Ronson